Ciclafrine (INN) is a sympathomimetic phenethylamine and antihypertensive that was never marketed.

Synthesis
Ciclafrine can be prepared by the reaction of norfenefrine with cycloheptanone.

References

Antihypertensive agents
Phenylethanolamine ethers
Oxazolidines
Spiro compounds
Abandoned drugs